Wola Baranowska  is a village in the administrative district of Gmina Baranów Sandomierski, within Tarnobrzeg County, Subcarpathian Voivodeship, in south-eastern Poland.

The village has a population of 2,266.

References

Wola Baranowska